Anastasiia is a given name. Notable people with the name include:

Anastasiia Arkhipova (born 2003), Ukrainian figure skater
Anastasiia Bryzgina (born 1998), Ukrainian sprinter
Anastasiia Galashina (born 1997), Russian sport shooter
Anastasiia Gorbunova (born 1995), Ukrainian alpine skier
Anastasiia Guliakova (born 2002), Russian figure skater
Anastasiia Hotfrid (born 1996), Ukrainian-born Georgian weightlifter
Anastasiia Iakovenko (born 1995), Russian racing cyclist
Anastasiia Makina (born 1997), Russian handballer
Anastasiia Matrosova (born 1982), Ukrainian judoka
Anastasiia Motak (born 2004), Ukrainian artistic gymnast
Anastasiia Mulmina (born 1997), Ukrainian group rhythmic gymnast
Anastasiia Mysnyk (born 1991), Ukrainian Paralympic athlete
Anastasiia Nedobiha (born 1994), Ukrainian diver
Anastasiia Semenova (born 1999), Russian badminton player
Anastasiia Silanteva (born 1998), Russian alpine skier
Anastasiia Todorova (born 1993), Ukrainian canoeist
Anastasiia Veresova (born 1991), Ukrainian female acrobatic gymnast

See also

Anastas
Anastasi (disambiguation)
Anastacia (given name)
Anastasia
Anastasija
Anastasiya
Anastassia
Annastasia

Antasia, a genus of moths in the family Geometridae

Feminine given names